The 2022 West Virginia Mountaineers baseball team represented the University of West Virginia during the 2022 NCAA Division I baseball season. The Mountaineers played their home games at Monongalia County Ballpark as a member of the Big 12 Conference. They were led by head coach Randy Mazey, in his 10th season at West Virginia.

Previous season 
The 2021 team finished the season with a 25–27 record and an 8–16 record in the Big 12. In the 2021 Big 12 Conference baseball tournament, the eighth-seeded Mountaineers upset top-seeded Texas in the first round 5–1, but fell 2–12 to fourth-seeded Oklahoma State and 2–3 to Texas to end their conference tournament in the Second Round. The Mountaineers did not earn an at-large bid to the 2021 NCAA Division I baseball tournament.

Personnel

Coaching staff

Roster

Schedule and results

Rankings

References

West Virginia
West Virginia Mountaineers baseball seasons
West Virginia Mountaineers baseball